The following are the national records in track cycling in Israel maintained by the Israel Cycling Federation (איגוד האופניים בישראל).

Men

Women

References
General
Israeli Track Cycling Records 14 August 2022 updated
Specific

External links
Israel Cycling Federation web site

Israel
Records
Track cycling
Track cycling